Dale Stevenson may refer to:

 Dale Stevenson (Canadian football) (born 1987), Canadian football offensive linemen
 Dale Stevenson (athlete) (born 1988), Australian athlete